Ohlin is a Swedish surname. Notable people with the surname include:

Alix Ohlin, Canadian writer
Axel Ohlin (1867–1903), Swedish zoologist and explorer
Bertil Ohlin (1899–1979), Swedish economist and politician, coauthor of Ohlin Report
Jörgen Ohlin (1937–2013), Swedish footballer
Lisa Ohlin (born 1960), Swedish screenwriter and director
Lloyd Ohlin (1918–2008), American sociologist and criminologist
Mattias Ohlin (born 1978), Swedish swimmer
Nils Ohlin (1895–1958), Swedish actor
Per "Dead" Ohlin (1969–1991), Swedish singer
Sture Ohlin (born 1935), Swedish biathlon competitor

See also
Ohlin Island, island of Antarctica
Heckscher–Ohlin (disambiguation)

Swedish-language surnames